Mesome Hussain (born 2 July 1995) is a Pakistani cricketer. He made his List A debut for Water and Power Development Authority in the 2017–18 Departmental One Day Cup on 28 December 2017.

References

External links
 

1995 births
Living people
Pakistani cricketers
Place of birth missing (living people)
Water and Power Development Authority cricketers